The 2005 European Speedway Club Champions' Cup.

See also 

2005
European C